Pierre-Hugues Herbert and Nicolas Mahut were the two-time defending champions, but retired in the first round against Marcus Daniell and Marcelo Demoliner.

Jamie Murray and Bruno Soares won the title, defeating Julien Benneteau and Édouard Roger-Vasselin in the final, 6–2, 6–3.

Seeds

Draw

Draw

Qualifying

Seeds

Qualifiers
  Marcus Daniell /  Marcelo Demoliner

Lucky losers
  Nicholas Monroe /  Donald Young

Qualifying draw

External links
 Main draw
 Qualifying draw

Doubles